107.2 The Wyre was a local commercial radio station serving Kidderminster, Bewdley, Stourport-on-Severn, Stourbridge and Bromsgrove in England. The station was owned by MNA Broadcasting but was sold to UTV Media and merged on Monday 26 March 2012 with The Severn and 107.7 The Wolf to form Signal 107, a station also serving the Wolverhampton, Shropshire and north Worcestershire area.

History
Originally launched in September 2005 by the Midlands News Association (MNA Broadcasting). After three years, The Wyre gained permission from OFCOM to leave its Kidderminster studios and co-locate with Telford FM in Shropshire.

On 3 February 2012 The Wyre, together with sister station The Severn, were acquired by UTV Media. Live programming ended on the same day on both stations. The station was rebranded as Signal 107 at midday on Monday 26 March 2012 and merged with The Severn & 107.7 The Wolf.

See also
 UTV Radio
 107.7 The Wolf
 The Severn
 Signal 107

References

Adult contemporary radio stations in the United Kingdom
Radio stations in Worcestershire
Radio stations in Shropshire
Defunct radio stations in the United Kingdom